The 2008–09 Polska Liga Hokejowa season was the 74th season of the Polska Liga Hokejowa, the top level of ice hockey in Poland. 10 teams participated in the league, and KS Cracovia won the championship.

First round

Final round

Qualification round

Playoffs

Relegation 
 KH Sanok - Polonia Bytom 4:0 (3:1, 5:3, 7:6 SO, 8:2)

External links
 Season on hockeyarchives.info

Polska Hokej Liga seasons
Polska
Polska